Foetus is a solo musical project of Australian musician JG Thirlwell. The project has had many similar names, each including the word 'Foetus'. The "members" of the project are aliases of Thirlwell; they include Frank Want, Phillip Toss, and Clint Ruin. Thirlwell occasionally collaborates with other artists, but does not consider them to be members of Foetus.

In 1981, after the breakup of PragVEC, Thirlwell started his own solo music project under the name of 'Foetus Under Glass'. After the album Thaw, Thirlwell stopped changing the name; thereafter it remained simply 'Foetus'.

In November 1983, Foetus undertook a tour with Marc Almond, Nick Cave and Lydia Lunch in the quickly dissolved 'partnership' known as The Immaculate Consumptive. He has also appeared on albums recorded by The The, Einsturzende Neubauten, Nurse With Wound and Anne Hogan.

In October 1985, Thirlwell made the album Nail, which became the most popular Foetus album of all time. 

Gash was issued in 1995, which led to acknowledgment from music journalists of Foetus's role in the development of industrial music.

Discography

Conceptual themes
All full-length Foetus album titles are four-letter, one-syllable words, often with multiple connotations.

The artwork of Foetus releases shows a deliberate progression of colour: the earliest releases are black-and-white, with the addition of red on the Deaf album, and further addition of yellow on Nail. Full-colour art was introduced on Gash. Beginning with Flow, the artwork of primary albums reverted to black/white/red, although other releases continue in full colour.

Notes

References

External links
 Official home page
 1995 interview with JG Thirlwell
 UK article
 
 Freq-out.org
 Official Myspace page for Llik your idols, a documentary about the Cinema of Transgression, featuring Foetus
 JG Thirlwell interview at AAJ
 JG Thirlwell / Foetus interview at MTJTS.com, midway down the page

JG Thirlwell
Musical groups established in 1981
Australian post-punk groups
Wax Trax! Records artists
Some Bizzare Records artists
Birdman Records artists